Wheezer may refer to:

 One who wheezes
 Wheezer Dell (1886–1966), American baseball pitcher
 Wheezer, nickname of Bobby Hutchins (1925–1945), American child actor
 Carl Wheezer, a character from Jimmy Neutron: Boy Genius

See also
 Weezer, American rock band